Aspelta was a ruler of the kingdom of Kush (c. 600 – c. 580 BCE). More is known about him and his reign than most of the rulers of Kush. He left several stelae carved with accounts of his reign.

Family
Aspelta was the son of Senkamanisken and Queen Nasalsa. Aspelta was the brother and successor of Anlamani. The King is thought to have had several wives, including Henuttakhebit (buried in pyramid Nuri 28), Meqemale (buried in pyramid Nuri 40), Asata (buried in pyramid Nuri 42), Artaha (buried in pyramid Nuri 58). he may have also been married to his sister Madiqen.

Aspelta used titles based on those of the Egyptian Pharaohs.
Horus name: Neferkha ("Whose Appearances are Beautiful") 
Nebty Name: Neferkha ("Whose Appearances are Beautiful") 
Golden Horus Name: Userib ("Whose heart is strong")
Prenomen: Merykare ("Re is one whose ka is loved") 
Nomen: Aspelta

Reign
According to relevant inscriptions, Aspelta was selected as ruler by a committee of twenty-four religious and military leaders.  He then set out north to Napata to be selected as king by the gods and crowned.

Another stele that might date from Aspelta's reign recounts how a group of priests were put to death, likely as punishment for conspiring against the king.

In 592 BCE, Kush was invaded by an Egyptian military expedition initiated by Pharaoh Psamtik II perhaps because Aspelta posed a threat to this pharaoh's authority over Upper Egypt, to the south and close to Kush. The invaders sacked Napata, and some historians believe that because of this attack, Aspelta decided to move the Nubian capital to the more secure city of Meroe.

Tomb
Aspelta's tomb was located at Nuri and is the second largest burial structure here. His tomb was excavated by George A. Reisner in 1916 and many items were discovered within it, most of which are now in the Museum of Fine Arts in Boston. The palace built by him and his brother was excavated by Reisner in 1920.

Monuments and items mentioning Aspelta

Aspelta is well attested. A list of items mentioning the King:
 Two cartouche-plaques of Aspelta (Ashmolean Mus. 1932.749 and Brussels, E.7010) from the West side room Temple A at Kawa.
 Fragments of granite stela of Aspelta (Ashmolean Mus. I9J2.I295) found in south-east corner of the Court in Temple T at Kawa.
 Wall depicting Aspelta, (Oxford, Ashmolean Mus. 1936.662). One scene shows the King offering image of Maat to the ram-headed god Amun-Re and Anukis-Nethy, another shows King before Amun-Re and Mut.
 Granite stela (Berlin Mus. 2268). The scene depicts Nastasen and the Queen-Mother Pelkha and similarly Nastasen with Queen Sakhmakh. The text is dated to year 8, and mentions King Aspelta, Harsiotef, Alara and Kambasuden. The stela probably comes from Gebel Barkal.
 A shrine dedicated to Aspelta was found at the temple in Sanam. 
 Stela of Aspelta (Louvre C. 257) Possibly from Sanam.
 A diorite stela of Khaliut, the Mayor of Kanad, son of Pi'ankhy, was erected by Aspelta. The text mention's the Queen-Mother Nasalsa.
 Enthronement-stela, year I of Aspelta with scene at top showing the Queen-Mother Nasalsa (Cairo Mus. Ent. 48866), was found at Gebel Barkal.
 Adoption-stela from year 3 of Aspelta probably from Sanam. The text records the appointment of Henuttakhebit as priestess of Napata. The King is shown with his mother Queen Nasalsa and Queen Madiqen.
 Statue of Aspelta (Boston Mus. 2J.7JO)
 A fragment of one of the canopic jars of Aspelta was found in Room A of the tomb of Anlamani (Nuri 6).
 Tomb Nuri 8 belonged to Aspelta. Excavated by Reisner in 1917. Four foundation deposits which include tablets and cups are now spread over several museums. A stela from the chapel was later reused in Tomb Nuri 100. The tomb had three burial chambers and included the sarcophagus of the King. Finds include: Gold and silver vases, inscribed gold vase (Boston Museum 20.341), Silver-spouted beaker (Boston Mus. 24.901.), Gold cylinders (Boston Mus. 21.339-40), Inscribed alabaster jars (Khartum Mus. 1386 A, Boston M us. 20.1070), Two canopic jars (Boston Mus. 20.1062), Porphyry offering-table (Boston Mus. 21.1192).
 Two alabaster jars with the name of Aspelta, found in tomb S.44 in the South Cemetery of Meroe (Boston Mus. 24.886, Khartum Mus. 182I)
 Alabaster vase with name of Aspelta, a faience fragment with cartouche of Aspelta (Brussels E. 3539, E. 3977) and faience fragment with cartouches of Aspelta (Copenhagen, Ny Carlsberg Glypt. IE.I.N. 1307-8)

Artifacts

References

7th-century BC births
6th-century BC monarchs of Kush
6th-century BC rulers
580s BC deaths